Bert Kameaaloha Mizusawa (born January 1957) is a retired major general in the United States Army, serving in the Army from 1979 to 2015. Mizusawa also served in the United States Senate as a professional staff member and as a Senior Executive in the Pentagon, making him one of only a handful of individuals to serve at flag rank in the military as well as in both the legislative and executive branches. Mizusawa is also an attorney and is admitted to the bars of New York, the District of Columbia, Virginia and the United States Supreme Court.

Early life
Bert K. Mizusawa was born January 1957 in Honolulu, Hawaii. Mizusawa is the second of six sons born to George T. and Theodora Mizusawa. Mizusawa's father met his mother in Europe while serving in the United States Army. Soon thereafter Mizusawa's father enlisted in the United States Air Force, and Mizusawa grew up in the Netherlands, Oklahoma, Ohio, Japan, Virginia and Germany before his family settled in Hampton, Virginia.

Education
High School

Mizusawa attended high school in Kaiserslautern and Frankfurt, Germany and in 1975 he graduated from Kecoughtan High School in Hampton, Virginia.  While in high school Mizusawa participated in varsity football, wrestling, and track.

West Point

In 1975 Mizusawa was accepted to the United States Military Academy at West Point.  While at West Point he served in the Cadet Captain position as Brigade Athletic Officer.  On June 6, 1979, Mizusawa received his bachelor's degree from then Deputy Secretary of Defense, Charles W. Duncan, Jr., and graduated as the "number one man"—first in his class.

Harvard

Mizusawa attended Harvard Law School and graduated with a Juris Doctor in 1989.  He also received a Master of Public Policy from the John F. Kennedy School of Government and was twice selected as a MacArthur Fellow in International Security.  While at Harvard, he interned with the United States Attorneys' Counterdrug Task Force.

Military
Graduating as top man on the list, Mizusawa received his first choice in the USMA Corps of Cadets' branch drawings—infantry.

Captain
As a captain, Mizusawa, an Airborne Ranger, served as a paratrooper in Italy with the 1-509th Airborne Battalion Combat Team and commanded the Army's most forward-deployed combat unit, the Joint Security Force, in the Korean DMZ.

Soviet Defector Incident

 Mizusawa led the Joint Security Force in a historic firefight against North Korean forces. 
Mizusawa was awarded the Silver Star for “exceptional valor and gallantry in action” while serving as the Commander of the Joint Security Force (JSF) Company at Panmunjom, Korea on 22 and 23 November 1984. His citation reads “In reaction to thirty attacking North Korean soldiers in pursuit of a Soviet defector, Captain Mizusawa's outstanding leadership and aggressive actions in leading his company while under fire were instrumental in defeating the enemy. Additionally, he personally led the defector to safety while under fire and deliberately, at great risk to himself, exposed himself to the enemy in front of his own troops to ensure the success of his company's combat action. Throughout the intense firefight, Captain Mizusawa displayed a complete disregard for his own personal safety while accomplishing his mission.”
Some have credited the successful firefight and rescue of the Soviet defector, which unexpectedly did not result in a Soviet demarche, for convincing President Reagan to hold firm in his negotiations with the Soviet Union, which ultimately led to the end of the Cold War.

Colonel
From 2001 to 2004, Mizusawa was assigned as the first commander of the Army Reserve's new
cyber command, the Army Reserve Information Operations Command. In 2005, he commanded the first team deployed to Afghanistan from the Joint Center of
Operational Analyses.

Brigadier General
As a brigadier general, Mizusawa served as the Deputy G3 (Operations) of the U.S. Army Materiel Command, as Deputy to the Commanding General, Multinational Corps-Iraq and as the Deputy Commanding General of the 335th Theater Signal Command.

Major General
On August 2, 2011 Mizusawa was promoted to major general and assumed the assignment of Deputy Director for Strategic Initiatives, Joint Chiefs of Staff.  He later served as the reserve assistant to the Chairman, Joint Chiefs of Staff and as commander of the Combined Joint Interagency Task Force-Afghanistan (CJIATF-A), which was awarded the Joint Meritorious Unit Award for its performance during Operation Enduring Freedom.

Civilian
Mizusawa was an attorney with the Wall Street law firm Sullivan & Cromwell from 1990 to 1994, where he advised underwriters on complex debt and equity issuances.  He was lead attorney for the largest debt offerings in the world at the time, the World Bank's US$2.5 billion Global Bonds, which were issued simultaneously in New York, London and Tokyo. From 2001 to 2004, Mizusawa was president of Innovative Technology Application, Inc., a technology firm with multimedia and industrial security products.  In 2004, Mizusawa founded Paxcentric, Inc., a technology and security consulting firm.

Government and politics
From 1995 to 1998, Mizusawa was appointed as a Professional Staff Member on the United States Senate Committee on Armed Services, where he assisted the chairman with oversight of national defense.  In 1996, he authored the GOP national security platform for the presidential campaign.  In 1998, he was appointed as a three-star level Senior Executive in The Pentagon.

In 2010, Mizusawa unsuccessfully ran for a U.S. Congress seat from Virginia. In May 2016, during the 2016 Republican presidential primary process, Mizusawa endorsed the candidacy of Donald Trump and soon thereafter became a foreign policy advisor to the Trump campaign. He authored the Trump doctrine for foreign policy, versions of which were published by USA Today on-line and in its print edition. Mizusawa was director of national security policy for the Presidential Transition Team. In 2018, he launched a campaign for the GOP nomination to challenge U.S. Senator Tim Kaine, but failed to collect enough signatures to make the ballot.

In early 2020, Mizusawa was appointed as a senior adviser for national security technology and business integration at the Central Intelligence Agency.

Articles
 Decentralized information age training: key to U.S. antiterrorism efforts. (Homeland Security) — (Sep. 2003) Colonel Mizusawa discusses the application of decentralized information age training in coping with the homeland security threat posed by terrorism in the U.S.  Colonel Mizusawa also discusses the advantage of the application for city and country leadership; challenges in the deployment process; and drawbacks of Internet-based applications.

Mentions
 Dangerous Games: faces, incidents and casualties of the Cold War by James E. Wise, Jr., and Scott Baron.  Naval Institute Press (2010): Annapolis, Maryland
 The Reagan Diaries edited by Douglas Brinkley.  The Ronald Reagan Presidential Library Foundation (2007): New York, New York (Referencing Soviet Defector Incident in Korean DMZ)

References

1957 births
Living people
People from Honolulu
United States Military Academy alumni
American military personnel of Japanese descent
Recipients of the Silver Star
Harvard Law School alumni
Harvard Kennedy School alumni
United States Army reservists
Recipients of the Legion of Merit
United States Army generals
Recipients of the Defense Superior Service Medal
Recipients of the Distinguished Service Medal (US Army)
Virginia Republicans
Hawaii Republicans
American politicians of Japanese descent
Trump administration personnel
People of the Central Intelligence Agency
Candidates in the 2018 United States Senate elections
Asian conservatism in the United States